The 2020 Lamar Hunt U.S. Open Cup was planned to be the 107th edition of the U.S. Open Cup, a knockout cup competition in American soccer. Atlanta United FC were the defending champions after defeating Minnesota United FC in the 2019 final. The competition was suspended on March 13, 2020, before the first round fixtures, because of the COVID-19 pandemic, and later canceled on August 17. Despite the tournament's cancelation, the spot for the 2021 CONCACAF Champions League was awarded to the defending champions, Atlanta United FC.

Qualification

This edition was planned to feature 100 teams, including 62 professional sides—both modern-era records. Entrants included the American clubs from across the soccer leagues system, with timing determined by league division. These include the 23 American clubs from Major League Soccer and clubs from the USL Championship and USL League One that are not owned or operated by an MLS team; MLS-affiliated clubs from these two leagues are eligible. Additionally, clubs from the National Independent Soccer Association (NISA), a sanctioned Division III league, were set to take part. This is the first time two professional leagues from the same tier have both competed in the tournament since 2017.

USL League Two and the National Premier Soccer League qualified teams based on previous season standings. Quantity of teams is determined by U.S. Soccer. Local qualifying was done by tournament and held in 2019. It featured 88 mostly amateur teams representing 18 different states and the District of Columbia (21 different state soccer associations). 12 teams qualified out of this tournament. Finally, as with the previous year, the reigning champion of the National Amateur Cup, Newtown Pride FC, automatically qualify for the tournament proper.

The 2020 edition of the U.S. Open Cup was planned to include a change in qualifying for professional teams. All Division II and Division III teams were to enter together in the second round, while Major League Soccer teams were planned to enter in the third and fourth rounds. The four 2020 CONCACAF Champions League qualifiers plus the four best American non-qualifiers in each 2019 MLS conference would enter in the fourth round; the remaining clubs would enter in the third round.

The U.S. Open Cup was scheduled to begin in March 2020, its earliest calendar date since 1995. The final was scheduled to take place in either early August or late September. The earlier start would have overlapped with the NCAA soccer season, causing lower-division teams to be unable to field their full lineups; Reading United AC and Flint City Bucks, both of USL League Two, along with Midland-Odessa Sockers FC of the National Premier Soccer League, announced they would not take part in the tournament due to this reason.

 $: Winner of $25,000 bonus for advancing the furthest in the competition from their respective divisions. 
 $$: Winner of $100,000 for being the runner-up in the competition.
 $$$: Winner of $300,000 for winning the competition.

Number of teams by state 
The 2020 Open Cup field represents a total of 36 states and the District of Columbia.

States without a team in the Open Cup: Alaska, Arkansas, Delaware, Hawaii, Idaho, Mississippi, Montana, New Hampshire, North Dakota, Rhode Island, South Dakota, Vermont, West Virginia, and Wyoming.

Match details
All times local to game site.

On March 13, 2020, U.S. Soccer announced that the U.S. Open Cup would be temporarily suspended due to the global coronavirus pandemic. Several participating leagues, including MLS and USL, had already announced month-long suspensions of activities. The tournament was cancelled on August 17, 2020, with all qualified teams planned to participate in the 2021 edition.

First round 
The first round of the Open Cup was scheduled to take place on March 24 and 25. There would have been 19 matches between 13 local qualifiers, 14 NPSL, and 11 USL2 teams. Teams are paired geographically, and pairings were announced on January 22. The fixtures were suspended on March 13 due to the coronavirus pandemic

Second round
The second round was scheduled to take place on April 7–9 with 29 matches, a modern-era Open Cup record. 19 winners from the First Round will be joined by 6 teams from USL1, 8 from NISA, and 25 from USL Championship (USLC). Pairings were made geographically when possible and announced on January 29.

Third round
The third round draw was to be conducted on April 10, with 20 matches planned to be played on April 21–23. 29 winners from the Second Round will be joined by the 11 lower-ranked American MLS teams in the 2019 season's final standings.

Round of 32
The round of 32 draw was to be conducted on April 24, with 16 matches to be played on May 19–20. 20 winners from the Third Round would join the 12 higher-ranked MLS teams.

Round of 16 and beyond
The draw for the round of 16 and quarter-finals was to be conducted on May 21. Beginning with the Round of 16, match dates would have been flexibly scheduled as follows:
 June 10: Possible Round of 16
 June 23–24: Possible Round of 16 or Quarter-finals
 July 14–15: Quarter-finals or Semi-finals
 August 11–12: Semi-finals or Final
 September 22–24: Possible Final

Broadcasting
All matches from the first round to the final were to be streamed on ESPN+. This is the second year of a four-year agreement between U.S. Soccer and ESPN to air the tournament.

References

External links
  at U.S. Soccer
 TheCup.us, an independent news site covering the U.S. Open Cup

 
U.S. Open Cup
U.S. Open Cup
U.S. Open Cup 2020